The name Breedon can refer to:
Breedon on the Hill, a village in North West Leicestershire, England
Breedon Books, a British publisher
Breedon Pippin apple
Breedon Group, an aggregates business in the UK

See also
Bredon, a village in Worcestershire, England
Breeden, a surname